Azteca is the debut album by former Santana band members Coke Escovedo and his brother Pete Escovedo with their new band, Azteca. 

The was album released by Columbia Records in December 1972 and debuted at No.178 on the Billboard 200 Album Chart on January 13, 1973, peaking at No.151 on February 17, 1973, and spending nine weeks in the charts.

Reception 

On the website Allmusic, music critic Stephen Thomas Erlewine wrote:

In December 1972 Billboard in its review of the album stated "the seventeen man conglomerate boasts, among other assets four fiery vocalists and a four man horn section that cooks to the boiling point. Especially powerful are 'Mamita Linda', 'You Can't Take the Funk Out of Me' and 'Love Not Then'".

Saturday Review of the Arts described it as an "impressive debut album", "featuring a bold, funky sound supported by an accordingly large batch of esteemed players, including graduates of Santana".

Track listing

Personnel
Azteca

 Coke Escovedo – Timbales
 Pete Escovedo – Vocals
 Errol Knowles – Vocals
 Wendy Haas – Vocals
 Rico Reyes – Vocals
 Victor Pantoja – Conga drums, Vocals
 Flip Nuñez – Organ
 George Moribus – Electric piano
 George DiQuattro – Piano, Clavinet
 Paul Jackson – Acoustic bass, Electric bass
 Lenny White III – Drums, Vocals
 Neal Schon – Guitar
 Jules Rowell – Valve trombone
 Tom Harrell – Trumpet
 Melvyn Martin – Soprano saxophone, Tenor saxophone, Baritone saxophone, Flute, Piccolo
 Bob Ferreira – Tenor saxophone, Piccolo
 James Vincent (Dondelinger) – Guitar

Production

Coke Escovedo, Azteca – Producer
Pete Escovedo – Arranger
Tom Harrell – Arranger
George Engfer – recording engineer
Glen Kolotkin – Engineer
George Horn – Mastering
Bruce Steinberg – Design, Artwork, Photography
Coke Escovedo – Sleeve Notes

References 

Columbia Records albums
1972 albums